"Thou Swell" is a show tune, a popular song and a jazz standard written in 1927.

History
The music was written by Richard Rodgers, with words by Lorenz Hart, for the 1927 musical A Connecticut Yankee. The lyric is notable, as indicated by the title, for its mix of archaic English and modern slang as the story takes place in both contemporary times and in King Arthur's court.

Recordings
An early recorded version featured The Broadway Nitelites conducted by Ben Selvin with vocals by Franklyn Baur (Columbia 1928).
There are many popular and jazz vocal renditions, including those by Nat King Cole (and later Natalie Cole), Bing Crosby for his 1976 album At My Time of Life, Sarah Vaughan, Frank Sinatra, Eydie Gormé, Ella Fitzgerald, Blossom Dearie, and Joe Williams. Bix Beiderbecke, Fats Waller, Harry James, J.J.Johnson and Billy May all recorded the song instrumentally.
In the MGM Technicolor biopic about Rodgers and Hart called Words and Music (1948), June Allyson sings and dances to Thou Swell with twin "knights" in an appropriately medieval setting.
An instrumental version was recorded in Oslo on April 29, 1954 by "Verden Rundt's" All Star Band (Rowland Greenberg (trp) - A. Skjold (trombone) - K. Stokke (alt) - K. Bergheim (tenor) - Knut Hyrum (baritone) - I. Børsum (bass) - Scott Lunde (piano) - K. O. Hoff (drums)). Arranger and conductor: Egil Monn-Iversen. It was released on the 78 rpm record Musica RA-9005. The B-side was "Perdido."
The music of the song is featured in the film All About Eve (1950). It is played on the piano at the party when Margo tells her friends to "fasten their seat belts."

References

External links
Lyrics at LorenzHart.org

Songs with music by Richard Rodgers
Songs with lyrics by Lorenz Hart
1927 songs
Songs from A Connecticut Yankee
Nat King Cole songs